This is a list of aircraft denominated B1, B-1, B.1 or B.I.

B-1
 Rockwell B-1 Lancer, a 1974 USAF heavy bomber aircraft
 Bensen B-1, a Bensen aircraft
 Blackburn B-1, a 1938 British twin-engined four-seat touring aircraft
 Boeing B-1, a 1919 seaplane
 Huff-Daland XB-1, a 1927 American biplane bomber

B.1 
 Sopwith B.1, a British Sopwith Aviation Company aircraft

B.I 
 AEG B.I, a German reconnaissance aircraft during World War I
 Albatros B.I, a 1913 German military reconnaissance aircraft
 Aviatik B.I, a 1914 German two-seat reconnaissance biplane
 Bavarian B I, an 1896 German steam locomotive model
 DFW B.I, a 1914 German aircraft
 Euler B.I, an Idflieg B-class designation aircraft
 Fokker B.I (1915), an Austro-Hungarian observation aircraft
 Fokker B.I (1922), a German reconnaissance flying boat
 Halberstadt B.I, an Idflieg B-class designation aircraft
 Hansa-Brandenburg B.I, a 1914 unarmed military reconnaissance biplane
 Kondor B.I, an Idflieg B-class designation aircraft
 Lohner B.I, a KuKLFT B-class designation aircraft
 LVG B.I, a 1910s German two-seat reconnaissance biplane
 NFW B.I, an Idflieg B-class designation aircraft
 Otto B.I, an Idflieg B-class designation aircraft
 Rumpler B.I, an Idflieg B-class designation aircraft
 Sablatnig B.I, an Idflieg B-class designation aircraft

See also
 Fokker B.I (disambiguation)

B1